The Nagarkot Panoramic Hiking Trail is a 12 km hike near the community of Nagarkot, Nepal. It is about a 3 to 3.5 hour walk, with views of the Himalayas. It includes the Nagarkot Nature Trail and the Tamang Village Walk.

References
Map

Hiking trails in Nepal